Chandera Railway Station  is a minor railway station serving the town of Trikaripur in the Kasaragod district of Kerala, India. Only four passenger trains stop here. It lies in the Shoranur–Mangalore section of the Southern Railways.  Trains halting at the station connect the town to places like Kozhikode, and Mangalore. .

References

Railway stations in Kasaragod district
Palakkad railway division